The Canton of Abbeville-Sud  is a former canton situated in the department of the Somme and in the Picardy region of northern France. It was disbanded following the French canton reorganisation which came into effect in March 2015. It had 13,960 inhabitants (2012).

Geography 
The canton is organised around the commune of Abbeville in the arrondissement of Abbeville. The altitude varies from 2m at Abbeville to 104m at Bray-lès-Mareuil.

The canton comprised 7 communes:
Abbeville (partly)
Bray-lès-Mareuil
Cambron
Eaucourt-sur-Somme
Épagne-Épagnette
Mareuil-Caubert
Yonval

See also
 Arrondissements of the Somme department
 Cantons of the Somme department
 Communes of the Somme department

References

Abbeville-Sud
Abbeville
2015 disestablishments in France
States and territories disestablished in 2015